The 9th Goya Awards were presented in Madrid, Spain on 20 January 1995.

Running Out of Time won the award for Best Film.

Winners and nominees
The nominees and winners are listed as follows:

Major award nominees

Other award nominees

Honorary Goya
 José María Forqué (director and screenwriter)

References

External links
Official website (Spanish)

09
1994 film awards
1994 in Spanish cinema